Clark Smith may refer to:

 Clark Allen Smith (1846–1921), Justice of the Kansas Supreme Court
 Clark Ashton Smith (1893–1961), American poet, sculptor, painter and author 
 Clark Smith (swimmer) (born 1995), American swimmer 
 Clark S. Smith (1912–2014), member of the Pennsylvania House of Representatives
 Clark Robert Smith, innovator in the wine industry
 Clark Smith, former hockey player with the Calgary Hitmen